Donal Patrick Murphy (born 23 February 1955 in Dublin, Ireland), is an Irish footballer who played as a winger in the League of Ireland and Football League.

After three seasons as an apprentice at Highfield Road the Republic of Ireland national football team youth international moved to Shamrock Rovers in October 1973. He made his League of Ireland debut on 4 November at Richmond Park and scored on his home debut at Milltown the following week.
His goal scoring exploits earned him the Player of the Month award in September 1974.

In February 1975 Murphy was called up to a Republic of Ireland national football team training session under Johnny Giles.

In September 1975 he was part of the Rovers squad that toured Japan.

The following month he re signed for Coventry.

After seven years in England he came home to sign for Drogheda United in October 1982 on a three-month contract and scored on his debut at Dalymount Park. At the end of his short contract he signed for Bohemian F.C. in February 1983 and scored the winner against the Hoops on his debut.
His last game for Bohs was as a substitute in the 1983 FAI Cup Final.

Murphy re signed for Drogheda in July 1983 and played twice against Tottenham Hotspur in the UEFA Cup.

In July 1984 he transferred to University College Dublin A.F.C. and again played twice against English opposition in European competition, this time against eventual winners Everton F.C. in the 1984–85 European Cup Winners' Cup.

Following six months at Home Farm F.C. he moved to his fifth Dublin club, Shelbourne F.C., in August 1985 and was part of the first Shels squad ever to be relegated.

Sources
 The Hoops by Paul Doolan and Robert Goggins

References

External links
 

1955 births
Living people
Republic of Ireland association footballers
Association footballers from Dublin (city)
Association football midfielders
Coventry City F.C. players
Shamrock Rovers F.C. players
Millwall F.C. players
Torquay United F.C. players
Plymouth Argyle F.C. players
Blackburn Rovers F.C. players
Drogheda United F.C. players
Bohemian F.C. players
University College Dublin A.F.C. players
Home Farm F.C. players
Shelbourne F.C. players
League of Ireland players
English Football League players